"Tommy Lee" is a song by American rapper and singer Tyla Yaweh featuring fellow American rapper and singer Post Malone. It was released on June 12, 2020 and serves as the lead single from Yaweh's upcoming second studio album, Rager Boy. Written alongside producers XL, RVNES, and Pearl Lion, it is Yaweh's first song to chart on the US Billboard Hot 100, peaking at number 65.

Background and composition
Two days before its release, the song was teased by Tyla Yaweh on Instagram. It is an ode to his "lavish lifestyle" and is named after Mötley Crüe drummer Tommy Lee, who also plays the drums on the song's rock remix, "accented by strings and choice chimes that serve as a base for emotive verses from Tyla and Post". The two sing about living like rockstars without having to worry about anything, but also "touch on the tribulations of their position".

Music video
The music video was released on June 12, 2020. It shows Yaweh and Malone driving in ATVs and limousines in a pastoral setting.

Remixes
An alternate version of the original track was released on July 10, 2020, with Tommy Lee himself playing on the drums. A second remix was released on August 28, 2020, featuring vocals from American rapper Saint Jhn.

Charts

Certifications

References

2020 singles
2020 songs
Post Malone songs
Songs written by Post Malone
Epic Records singles